John Kennedy (May 14, 1834 – September 28, 1910) was born a British subject in Ireland, and became an American citizen and a private in the Union Army. He received the United States military's highest decoration for bravery, the Medal of Honor, for his actions during the Battle of Trevilian Station in the American Civil War.

Biography
He was born May 14, 1834 and at the Battle of Trevilian Station in Virginia on June 11, 1864, he and four other soldiers were assigned to a twelve-pound-capacity brass artillery piece under direct command of Lt. William Egan, as part of the battery commanded by Lt. Alexander Pennington, within Gen. George Armstrong Custer's Michigan Cavalry Brigade. A squadron of cavalry led by Confederate Capt. Daniel A. Grimsley attacked their position, and a retreat was ordered. Kennedy and Pvt. Charles O'Neil remained at the cannon to cover the retreat of the rest of their unit, at some point becoming cut off from retreating themselves. They exhausted first their grape shot and canister shot, then their rifle and then pistol ammunition, finally being captured while continuing resistance with handspikes and sponge staffs. (Their position and the cannon were shortly recaptured in a Union artillery and cavalry counter-attack.)

The captured privates were imprisoned at the Andersonville prison; Kennedy survived, and served after the war in the Regular Army, advancing to the rank of ordnance sergeant and retiring in 1891. He was nominated for the Medal of Honor in 1892 by Lt. Carle E. Woodruff, and this was endorsed by Pennington, at that point a major.

He died September 28, 1910 and is buried in Oakland Cemetery Little Rock, Arkansas. His grave can be found in the Willow lot 298.

Medal of Honor citation
His Medal of Honor citation in 1892 described his actions as
Remained at his gun, resisting with its implements the advancing cavalry, and thus secured the retreat of his detachment.

See also

List of Medal of Honor recipients
List of American Civil War Medal of Honor recipients: G–L

Notes

References

Eric J. Wittenberg & Gordon C. Rhea, Glory Enough for All: Sheridan's Second Raid and the Battle of Trevilian Station, esp. pp. 120-122 and notes at p. 131

1834 births
1910 deaths
Military personnel from County Cavan
19th-century Irish people
Irish soldiers in the United States Army
People from County Cavan
United States Army Medal of Honor recipients
Union Army soldiers
Irish emigrants to the United States (before 1923)
Irish-born Medal of Honor recipients
Military personnel from New York City
American Civil War recipients of the Medal of Honor